Kharar Sri Aurobindo Vidyamandir, is one of the oldest school, in the village Kharar of sub-division Ghatal, Paschim Medinipur, West Bengal, India. It is a co-ed Higher Secondary School.

The school follows the course curricula of West Bengal Board of Secondary Education (WBBSE) and West Bengal Council of Higher Secondary Education (WBCHSE) for Standard 10th and 12th Board examinations respectively.

See also
Education in India
List of schools in India
Education in West Bengal

References

External links

High schools and secondary schools in West Bengal
Schools in Paschim Medinipur district
Schools affiliated with the Sri Aurobindo Ashram
Educational institutions in India with year of establishment missing